Apollonius, the son of Archias, was an Athenian sculptor around the 1st century. He made the bronze head of the young hero, which was found at Herculaneum and is engraved in the Mus. Hercul. i. tab. 45. It bears the inscription, ΑΠΟΛΛΟΝΙΟΣ ΑΠΧΙΟΥ ΑΘΗΝΑΙΟΣ ΕΠΩΗΣΕ. It probably belongs to the period about the birth of Jesus.

Notes

Ancient Greek sculptors
1st-century Athenians
Ancient Athenian sculptors